Arakvaz (also Romanized as Arak Vāz, Arkvāz, Erkewaz, and Arkwāz; also known as , Arak Vāz-e Malek Shāhī, and Qal‘eh Darreh) is a city in and capital of Malekshahi County, Ilam Province, Iran. At the 2006 census, its population was 14,225, in 2,771 families. It is adjacent to the city of Delgosha, bordering it to the north.

The city is populated by Kurds from the Malekshahi tribe.

References

Populated places in Malekshahi County

Cities in Ilam Province
Kurdish settlements in Ilam Province